Joachim Heinrich Wilhelm Wagener (16 July 1782 in Berlin – 18 January 1861 in Berlin) was a German banker and patron of the arts. His collection formed the initial nucleus of the Alte Nationalgalerie in Berlin.

Life and work

Bibliography

Exhibition catalogues 
 Gustav Friedrich Waagen: Verzeichniß der Gemälde-Sammlung des am 18. Januar zu Berlin verstorbenen königlichen schwedischen und norwegischen Konsuls J. H. W. Wagener, welche durch letztwillige Bestimmung in den Besitz S. M. des Königs übergegangen ist. Decker, Berlin 1861.
 Digitalisat der Ausgabe 1866 (Columbia University NY).
 Digitalisat der Ausgabe 1871 (Harvard).
 Katalog der Sammlung von Autographen und Historischen Documenten des im J. 1861 verstorbenen J. H. W. Wagener Bankier und K. Schwed. u. Norweg. Konsul in Berlin. Versteigerung den 26. Februar im Kunst-Auctions-Hause. (B. Lopke) zu Berlin. Berlin 1877.

Studies 
 Udo Kittelmann / Birgit Verwiebe / Angelika Wesenberg (Hg.): Die Sammlung des Bankiers Wagener. Die Gründung der Nationalgalerie. E. A. Seemann Verlag, Leipzig 2011, 
 Eberhard Roters: Die Nationalgalerie und ihre Stifter. Mäzenatentum und staatliche Förderung in Dialog und Widerspruch. In: Günter Braun (Hrsg.): Mäzenatentum in Berlin. Walter de Gruyter, Berlin etc. 1993, S. 73–98.

References

External links 
 Anniversary exhibition at the Nationalgalerie

1782 births
1861 deaths
German art collectors
19th-century art collectors
German bankers
Businesspeople from Berlin
19th-century German businesspeople